Iasmos is a town and a municipality in the Rhodope regional unit of Thrace, Greece. It is built on the side of the Rhodope Mountains. Although references about the village date back to the 16th Century, it is likely that those references are about the old location of the village, a few kilometres west of the current position. The actual date that the inhabitants settled in the current place is between the late 18th century and 1814 (the latter date is inscribed on the wall of the oldest church in the village).

Municipality
The municipality Iasmos was formed at the 2011 local government reform by the merger of the following 3 former municipalities, that became municipal units:
Amaxades
Iasmos
Sostis

The municipality has an area of 485.285 km2, the municipal unit 221.795 km2.

People
 Kostas Lazaridis (1900-1943), trade unionist
 George Chouliarakis, Greek politician and former Minister of Finance

References

Municipalities of Eastern Macedonia and Thrace
Populated places in Rhodope (regional unit)